A newspaper delivery bag is a satchel used by a paperboy to carry newspapers out for delivery. These bags were often made of canvas.

References 

Newspapers